Kelly Glenn Williams is an Austin, Texas based filmmaker and film programmer. He has served as the Film Program Director at the Austin Film Festival from 2004 to the present. In 2007 he received an Excellence Award at the International Film Festival Summit. He has produced numerous award-winning short films, including the Student Academy Award nominee Perils in Nude Modeling and the feature-length documentary Cadence. Additionally, he wrote and directed the narrative short film Richard and the documentary short Sid Smith for Congress. He is an active member of the Austin Media Arts Council. Williams attended the writing program at The Second City in Chicago and is also a graduate of the film program at the University of Texas at Austin .

Filmography 
Separation Anxiety (2008)
Sid Smith for Congress (2008)
Richard (2004)
Perils in Nude Modeling (2003, producer)
Occam's Razor: The Great Dialogues of Mindy  (2001, producer)

External links 
2007 Indiewire article featuring Williams
Cinematical photoblog: Williams with Jake Kasdan

Year of birth missing (living people)
Living people
Artists from Austin, Texas
American filmmakers
Moody College of Communication alumni